WSMR may refer to:

 White Sands Missile Range, a military base in New Mexico, United States
 West Shropshire Mineral Railway, a UK railway authorised in 1862 but not built
 West Somerset Mineral Railway, UK railway, with inclined plane, transporting minerals to port. Opened in 1861.
 Wrexham, Shropshire and Marylebone Railway, a former train operating company in the United Kingdom
 WSMR (FM), a radio station (89.1 FM) licensed to Sarasota, Florida, United States